The Nicolet River is a river in Quebec, Canada. It is a tributary of the Saint Lawrence River on its southern shore and flows into Lake Saint Pierre. It is named in honor of the pioneer Jean Nicolet.

It has several tributaries including the River Bulstrode and the Nicolet River Southwest. Its watershed is mainly in the Centre-du-Québec region although the Southwest Nicolet rises in Estrie. The city of Nicolet is near its mouth on the lake Saint-Pierre which is crossed to the northwest by the St. Lawrence River.

Geography

Hydrology 

It then flows in a northwesterly direction to Nicolet where it flows into lac Saint-Pierre.

Its main tributaries are, from upstream to downstream, the rivers des Vases, des Pins, des Rosiers, Bulstrode and Nicolet Southwest. The basin includes 40 lakes, the most important of which are lake Nicolet, les Trois Lacs (Les Sources) and the Beaudet reservoir.

Geology 

The part upstream of Saint-Léonard-d'Aston is part of the Appalaches. The subsoil is composed of sedimentary rocks folded and metamorphosed (shale, slate and sandstone), volcanic rocks (basalt) and ultramafic rocks (Serpentine and asbestos). As for the section downstream from Saint-Léonard-d'Aston, it is composed of sedimentary rocks (schist, dolomite, limestone, sandstone) in horizontal strata of the St. Lawrence Lowlands.

The unconsolidated deposits of the Quaternary of the St. Lawrence Lowlands are composed of clay, sand and gravel from the retreat of the Champlain Sea and peatlands. The Appalachian sector is composed of tills from the retreat of the glaciers and fluvioglacial deposits composed of sand and gravel.

Population 
The basin was inhabited by 96665 inhabitants in 2003. The territory is included in 37 municipalities. The main towns in the basin are Victoriaville (39799 inhabitants), Nicolet (7963 inhabitants) and Asbestos (6627 inhabitants).

Toponymy 

The river was initially baptized Rivière Du Pont by Samuel de Champlain in 1609 to honor his friend François Gravé, sieur du Pont. It also bore the name of Gast river, in honor of Pierre Dugua de Mons (general of New France) and Monet River, in honor of Pierre Monet, sieur de Moras. As for its current name, it owes it to the explorer Jean Nicolet. They also bore the name of the first lords of Nicolet, namely Laubia and Cressé. The Abenakis call it Pithiganitekw, which means 'river of the entrance', due to the fact that it flows near the outlet of lake Saint-Pierre.

The toponym "rivière Nicolet" was made official on December 5, 1968 at the Commission de toponymie du Québec.

See also 
 List of rivers of Quebec

Further reading
Carline Ghazal, Sonia Dumoulin and Marie-Christine Lussier, "Portrait de l'environnement du bassin versant de la rivière Nicolet", Corporation de gestion des rivières des Bois-Francs, 2006, 173 p. Read online

References

External links
Corporation pour la promotion de l'environnement de la rivière Nicolet, COPERNIC 

Rivers of Centre-du-Québec
Tributaries of the Saint Lawrence River